Félix Rousseau (1887–1981) was a Belgian historian.

Rousseau was born at Namur on 14 January 1887 and died there on 7 September 1981.

Publications (selected)
1921: Henri l'Aveugle, comte de Namur et de Luxembourg, 1136-1196
1936: Actes des comtes de Namur de la première race, 946-1196
1942: Introduction historique à l'art mosan
1951: Le Namurois; introduction et notes de Félix Rousseau; photographies de R. Tamines, J. Cayet et Ch. Dessart
1952: Le Mariage d'Ermesinde de Namur et de Thibaut de Bar, 1189 ou 1196-1197?
1967: La Wallonie, terre romane; 4e édition revue et augmentée
1970: L'Art mosan, introduction historique. 2ème édition
1971: Légendes et coutumes du pays de Namur
1977: À travers l'histoire de Namur, du Namurois et de la Wallonie. Recueil d'articles de Félix Rousseau
1993: La Wallonie, terre romane (sixième éd.); L'Art mosan (troisième éd.)
--?--: Namur, ville mosane

References

1887 births
1981 deaths
20th-century Belgian historians
People from Namur (city)
Walloon movement activists
Walloon people
Belgian archivists